Etim may refer to:

People

Given name
 Etim Inyang (1931–2016), Nigerian police officer
 Etim Moses Essien (born 1934), Nigerian haematologist
 Etim Esin (born 1966), Nigerian football player

Surname
 Emmanuel Etim (born 1980), Nigerian politician
 Ernest Ibok Etim-Bassey (1926–1998), Nigerian politician
 Margaret Etim (born 1992), Nigerian sprinter 
 Matthew Etim (born 1989), Nigerian football player
 Monday Etim (born 1998), Nigerian football player
 Nse Ikpe-Etim (born 1974), Nigerian actress
 Terry Etim (born 1986), English mixed martial artist

Places
 Etim Ekpo, Nigeria

Standards
 ETIM (standard), international product classification system

Other
 Turkistan Islamic Party, formerly known as the East Turkestan Islamic Movement or ETIM